The Tour of Misia 2007 Ascension was the eleventh concert tour by Japanese recording artist Misia, in support of her album Ascension (2007). Comprising a set list of songs from Ascension and previous albums, including two hip-hop and house medleys, the tour visited arenas nationwide for a duration of four months. The tour was announced on August 3, 2006, two days prior to the start of Misia's Hoshizora no Live III Music Is a Joy Forever summer tour. The Tour of Misia 2007 Ascension commenced in November 2006 and concluded three days after the release of Ascension, in February 2007. Initially scheduled to run for eighteen shows, an additional date was later added to the itinerary. Sponsored by OCN, the tour drew an estimated audience of 160,000.

The concept for the show is described as "futuristic rhythm with a taste of nature." The stage resembled a floating octagon-shape mirror, adorned with 10,000 LED lights and overlooked by a giant pipe-made elephant head, reminiscent of the first press edition cover artwork of Ascension.

On April 6, 2007, WOWOW aired a special titled The Tour of Misia 2007 in Yokohama Arena, which showed a TV edit of the tour's finale show.

Opening acts 
 May J. (February 3–4, 2007 dates only)

Setlist

Tour dates

Personnel 

Executive Producer – Hiroto Tanigawa
Hip Hop Medley Producer – Megaraiders
House Medley Producer – DJ Gomi
Production Producer – Kazuhiko Igarashi
Stage Manager(s) – Shuichi Majima, Ryoko Tsukahara, Mitsuru Morita
Set Director(s) – Chihiro Natori, Hiromi Shibata, Teruhiko Kuroki
Set Design – Yuko Kohga
Steel Master – Nobuyuki Yoshimoto
Costume Director – Kyoko Fushimi
Knit Direction – Mayutan
Knit Designer(s) – Jung-jung, Mindy, Risa Yuasa
Sound Planner – Keiji Shigeta
PA Operator(s) – Takashi Mitsui, Miyuki Tsuzuki
Lighting Planner – Ikuo Ogawa
Lighting Operator(s) – Masaaki Takahashi, Makoto Setoyama, Takashi Fujiwara
Lighting Effect Planner – Seiichi Tozuka
Lighting Effect Operator(s) – Nozomu Omae, Hiromi Iizuka
Special Effect Planner – Takeshi Hagino
Special Effect Operator – Kanako Chiba
Equipment Technician(s) – Kazuyuki Okada, Keiji Tateishi, Takuya Kimura, Hiroshi Yamane
Power Supply Operator(s) – Naotaka Tanimura, Yasutada Shibata
Special Stage Set – Minoru Osada
Camera System – Yasuhiro Shimizu, Ryuta Honma
Transporter(s) – Setsuo Noto, Miwa Morioka

Drums – Jun Aoyama
Keyboards – Tohru Shigemi
Bass – Takeshi Taneda
Guitar – Kenji Suzuki
Chorus/Organ – Kumi Sasaki
DJ – Ta-Shi
Dancer(s) – Stezo, Hyrossi, U-Ge, Michie, Hiro, Nada, Wadoo, Kota, Tatsuo, Soichiro, Gan
Band Manager – Mari Koda
Dancer Manager – Hiroaki Kusano
Sports Trainer(s) – Yukinori Narushima, Takayuki Yumioka, Kayoko Nakagawa
Wardrobe – Erina Ishihara
Make Up – Kaori
Hair – Yukimi Ueda
Artist Manager(s) – Naoko Kobayashi, Toshiyuki Kimura
Merchandising – Hiroshi Suzuki, Keisuke Sato, Rui Nishikawa
Food Coordination – Masahi Mizukoshi
Club MSA – Kyosuke Ogata, Tsutomu Yamashiro, Hiroko Goto
Tour Coordination – Chieko Ishii, Tetsuro Ishihara
Tour Coordination Assistant(s) – Kumiko Ohata, Kimie Ikeda
Tour Sponsor(s) – OCN
Promoter(s) – WESS, Kyodo Tohoku, Kyodo Hokuriku, Disk Garage, Sundayfolk Promotion, Sundayfolk Promotion Hizuoka, Kyodo Osaka, Kyodo Nishinippon
Producer(s) – Yasunao Matsumoto, Hiroyuki Ishigaki

Credits and personnel as per The Tour of Misia 2007 Ascension concert DVD.

References

External links
 

2006 concert tours
2007 concert tours
Misia concert tours
Albums recorded at the Yokohama Arena